Amity University, Gurugram, also known as Amity University, Haryana, is a private university located in the Pachgaon cluster of villages, near Manesar, Gurugram district, Haryana, India. The university was established in 2010 by the Amity Education Group through The Haryana Private Universities (Amendment) Act, 2010.

Academics
The university offers more than 100 programmes.

Schools
The university comprises 18 schools and institutes:
 Amity Business School
 Amity College of Commerce
 Amity College of Nursing
 Amity Institute of Behavioural and Allied Sciences
 Amity Institute of Biotechnology
 Amity Law School
 Amity Medical School
 Amity School of Applied Sciences
 Amity School of Communication
 Amity School of Engineering and Technology
 Amity School of Fashion Design and Technology
 Amity School of Fine Arts
 Amity School of Architecture and Planning
 Amity School of Hospitality
 Amity School of Liberal Arts
 Amity School of Earth & Environment Science
 Amity School of Languages
 Amity Institute of Clinical Psychology
 Amity Institute of pharmacy

Accreditation 
Amity University, Gurugram is recognized by the University Grants Commission (UGC). It is also accredited by the Accreditation Service for International Colleges (ASIC). The Amity School of Engineering and Technology is accredited with the Institution of Engineering and Technology (IET) and the Amity Business School is accredited by the Accreditation Council for Business Schools and Programs (ACBSP).

Campus
It houses more than 3,000 students.

References

External links

Gurgaon district
Universities in Haryana
Educational institutions established in 2010
2010 establishments in Haryana
Private universities in India